Live on the Rocks is a live album by rock band Blues Traveler, recorded at their annual Red Rocks Independence Day shows in 2003.

Track listing

Note: ' > ' denotes a segue into the next song.

 "Carolina Blues"
 "You Lost Me There"
 "No Woman, No Cry" (with Ziggy Marley)
 "Save His Soul"
 "Hook"
 "Let Her and Let Go"
 "Support Your Local Emperor" >
 "This Ache"
 "Eventually"
 "Unable to Get Free"
 "Can't See Why" >
 "You Reach Me" >
 "Crash Burn"
 "Thinnest of Air"

See also

Thinnest of Air, concert DVD of the 2003 Red Rocks shows

Blues Traveler live albums
2004 live albums
Sanctuary Records live albums